Jože Dežman (born 26 September 1955) is a Slovenian historian, museum curator, philosopher and editor. He served as the director of the National Museum of Contemporary History in Ljubljana. Since March 2012, he has been the director of the Archives of Slovenia, where he had replaced Dragan Matić. Matić characterised the replacement as politically motivated and pointed out that Dežman is not an archivist.

Dežman was born in the Upper Carniolan town of Lesce. He studied history and philosophy at the University of Ljubljana and finished his studies in 1997. For twenty years, he actively participated in the League of Communists of Slovenia and other Communist political organisations. In the 1990s, he was an active member of the liberal party Liberal Democracy of Slovenia. He later turned to more conservative positions. Since the mid-2000s, he has advocated the inclusion of anti-Communist perspectives in Slovenian historiography.

Dežman described the fundamental characteristics of the crimes following the Second World War as follows:

Dežman was the first chairman of the Commission on Concealed Mass Graves in Slovenia. He contributed to the European Public Hearing on "Crimes Committed by Totalitarian Regimes" organized by Slovenian Presidency of the Council of the European Union (January–June 2008) and the European Commission by writing the chapter "Communist Repression and Transitional Justice in Slovenia" for the report.

See also
Slovenians
Commission on Concealed Mass Graves in Slovenia
European Public Hearing on "Crimes Committed by Totalitarian Regimes"

References 

20th-century Slovenian historians
People from the Municipality of Radovljica
1955 births
Living people
Contemporary history of Slovenia
Slovenian government officials
University of Ljubljana alumni
21st-century Slovenian historians